The Norwegian Figure Skating Championships are the figure skating national championships held annually to crown the national champions of Norway. Skaters compete in the disciplines of men's singles, ladies' singles, pair skating, and ice dancing, across different levels. Not every event has been held in every year due to a lack of entries. The competition is organized by the Norwegian Skating Association, which became a member of the International Skating Union in 1894. In the period 1894-1970 this championship were competed at the same place and time as Norwegian Allround Championships for men in speedskating.

Senior medalists

Men

Ladies

Pairs

Junior medalists

Men

Ladies

Advanced novice medalists

Men

Ladies

References

External links
 Norwegian Skating Union
 ISU Skater Biographies Men
 ISU Skater Biographies Ladies

 
Figure skating in Norway
Figure skating national championships